Hylemya urbica is a species of fly in the family Anthomyiidae. It is found in the Palearctic . For identification see:

References

External links
Images representing Hylemya urbica at BOLD

Anthomyiidae
Insects described in 1896
Muscomorph flies of Europe